Eohostimella heathana is an early, probably terrestrial, "plant" known from compression fossils of Early Silurian age (Llandovery, around ). The chemistry of its fossils is similar to that of fossilised vascular plants, rather than algae. Its anatomy constitutes upright, cylindrical tubes, with a thickened outer cortex, which might have contained traces of lignin or a similar compound, even though no tracheids or similar vessels have been found; the lignin-like compound was presumably associated with its thick outer cortex. It branched dichotomously and might have borne small spines. It was probably affiliated with the rhyniophytes.

References

Prehistoric plant genera
Silurian life
Prehistoric plants of North America